This is a list of notable events in country music that took place in the year 1990.

Events
 January 20 — Billboard magazine begins basing the Hot Country Singles chart entirely on radio airplay through Nielsen Broadcast Data Systems (BDS), which uses a computerized system to detect actual radio spins. The number of chart positions is reduced from 100 to 75. The new system has an immediate effect on how long the year's biggest songs stay at No. 1:
 February 3 — "Nobody’s Home" by Clint Black becomes the first three-week No. 1 since Randy Travis' "Forever and Ever, Amen" in 1987.
 April 7 — Travis' "Hard Rock Bottom of Your Heart" breaks the four-week barrier, the first since 1978's "Mamas Don't Let Your Babies Grow Up to Be Cowboys" by Waylon Jennings and Willie Nelson.
 July 7 — "Love Without End, Amen" by George Strait is Billboards first five-week No. 1 song, matching 1977's "Here You Come Again" by Dolly Parton. Incidentally, "Love Without End, Amen" is Strait's first multi-week chart-topper, after his first 18 No. 1s had spent just one week on top.
 Just 23 songs would reach the chart's summit in 1990, 13 of them multi-weekers; this was fewer than half the number that reached the top of the chart a year earlier, and the fewest since 1972.

No dates
The Smithsonian Institution releases Classic Country Music: A Smithsonian Collection, a 100-track, four-volume set including the most important and notable songs in the genre's history, from 1924 to 1987. The set, which includes an 84-page booklet by historian Bill Malone, replaces the Smithsonian's eight-volume, 143-track set – titled The Smithsonian Collection of Classic Country Music – issued in 1981.
 The release of Classic Country Music: A Smithsonian Collection continues a trend towards chronicling the genre's history via compact disc during the late 1980s and early 1990s. Time-Life Music's Country USA series continued to issue new albums, while Columbia Records issues its five-volume Country Classics series during the summer. Rhino Records also releases ten volumes of Billboard Top Country Singles, each depicting the top 10 songs from the years 1959 through 1968.

Top hits of the year

Singles released by American artists

Singles released by Canadian artists

Top new album releases

Other top albums

On television

Regular series
 Hee Haw (1969–1993, syndicated)

Births
 January 8 – Frank Ray, singer known for his 2022 hit "Country'd Look Good on You".
 March 2 — Luke Combs, singer-songwriter of the 2010s. 
 March 30 — Thomas Rhett, singer-songwriter, son of singer-songwriter Rhett Akins.
 April 10 — Maren Morris, musician and singer-songwriter known for her 2016 hit "My Church".
 April 24 — Carly Pearce, singer-songwriter of the 2010s.
 May 17 — Kree Harrison, singer and musician, who was the runner-up on the twelfth season of American Idol.
 May 27 — Brett Kissel, Canadian country singer of the 2010s.
 July 23 — Neil Perry, member of The Band Perry.
 July 27 — Cheyenne Kimball, member of Gloriana from 2008–2011.
October 22 — Dylan Scott, singer known for his hits "My Girl" and "Hooked".

Deaths
 April 26 – Wesley Rose, 72, president of Acuff-Rose Music publishing.
 August 15 — Lew DeWitt, 52, tenor and founding member of the Statler Brothers (complications from Crohn's disease)
 October 31 — Carl Belew, 59, best known for writing the song "Am I That Easy to Forget" (cancer)

Hall of Fame inductees

Country Music Hall of Fame inductees
Tennessee Ernie Ford (1919–1991)

Canadian Country Music Hall of Fame inductees
Gordie Tapp
Ron Sparling

Major awards

Grammy AwardsBest Female Country Vocal Performance — "Where've You Been", Kathy MatteaBest Male Country Vocal Performance — "When I Call Your Name", Vince GillBest Country Performance by a Duo or Group with Vocal — Pickin' on Nashville, The Kentucky HeadhuntersBest Country Collaboration with Vocals — "Poor Boy Blues", Chet Atkins and Mark KnopflerBest Country Instrumental Performance — "So Soft, Your Goodbye", Chet Atkins and Mark KnopflerBest Country Song — "Where've You Been", Don Henry and Jon VeznerBest Bluegrass Recording — "I've Got That Old Feeling", Alison Krauss

Juno AwardsCountry Male Vocalist of the Year — George FoxCountry Female Vocalist of the Year — Rita MacNeilCountry Group or Duo of the Year — Prairie Oyster

Academy of Country MusicEntertainer of the Year — Garth BrooksSong of the Year — "The Dance", Tony Arata (Performer: Garth Brooks)Single of the Year — "Friends in Low Places", Garth BrooksAlbum of the Year — No Fences, Garth BrooksTop Male Vocalist — Garth BrooksTop Female Vocalist — Reba McEntireTop Vocal Duo — The JuddsTop Vocal Group — ShenandoahTop New Male Vocalist — Alan JacksonTop New Female Vocalist — Shelby LynneTop New Vocal Duo or Group — Pirates of the MississippiVideo of the Year — "The Dance", Garth Brooks (Director: John Lloyd Miller)

 ARIA Awards 
(presented in Sydney on March 26, 1990)Best Country Album - Warragul (John Williamson)

Canadian Country Music AssociationBud Country Fans' Choice Award — k.d. langMale Artist of the Year — George FoxFemale Artist of the Year — Michelle WrightGroup of the Year — Prairie OysterSOCAN Song of the Year — "Pioneers", Barry BrownSingle of the Year — "Goodbye, So Long, Hello", Prairie OysterAlbum of the Year — Absolute Torch and Twang, k.d. langTop Selling Album — Rita, Rita MacNeilVideo of the Year — "Pioneers", Family BrownVista Rising Star Award — Patricia ConroyDuo of the Year — Gary Fjellgaard and Linda Kidder

Country Music AssociationEntertainer of the Year — George StraitSong of the Year — "Where've You Been", Don Henry and Jon Vezner (Performer: Kathy Mattea)Single of the Year — "When I Call Your Name", Vince GillAlbum of the Year — Pickin' on Nashville, The Kentucky HeadhuntersMale Vocalist of the Year — Clint BlackFemale Vocalist of the Year — Kathy MatteaVocal Duo of the Year — The JuddsVocal Group of the Year — The Kentucky HeadhuntersHorizon Award — Garth BrooksMusic Video of the Year — "The Dance", Garth Brooks (Director: John Lloyd Miller)Vocal Event of the Year — "'Til a Tear Becomes a Rose", Lorrie Morgan and Keith WhitleyMusician of the Year' — Johnny Gimble

Further reading
Kingsbury, Paul, "The Grand Ole Opry: History of Country Music. 70 Years of the Songs, the Stars and the Stories," Villard Books, Random House; Opryland USA, 1995
Millard, Bob, "Country Music: 70 Years of America's Favorite Music," HarperCollins, New York, 1993
Whitburn, Joel, "Top Country Songs 1944–2005 – 6th Edition." 2005.

Other links
Country Music Association
Inductees of the Country Music Hall of Fame

External links
Country Music Hall of Fame

Country
Country music by year